This is a list of all tornadoes that were confirmed by local offices of the National Weather Service in the United States from November to December 2013.

November

November 1 event

November 4 event

November 17 event

November 26 event

December

December 14 event

December 20 event

December 21 event

See also
Tornadoes of 2013
Tornado outbreak of November 17, 2013

Notes

References

Tornadoes of 2013
2013, 11
November 2013 events in the United States
December 2013 events in the United States